The Employee Relations Law Journal is a legal journal which publishes articles in the field of labor and employment law. The journal covers employment law issues such as the Americans with Disabilities Act, family medical leave, sexual harassment, terminations, age discrimination, alternative dispute resolution, National Labor Relations Board decisions, and trends in employment law. The journal also includes regular columnists. These explore topics such as new employment and labor relations laws, regulations, court cases, developments in employee benefits administration, on-the-job safety and health issues, and labor-management relations. The journal is published quarterly by Wolters Kluwer.

External links

Labour law journals
English-language journals
Wolters Kluwer academic journals
Quarterly journals
United States labor law